Der Pfundskerl is a German television series.

See also
List of German television series

External links
 

German crime television series
Television shows set in Hamburg
Television series about journalism
2000 German television series debuts
2005 German television series endings
German-language television shows
Sat.1 original programming